Al-Bassah could refer to the following places:

Al-Bassa, depopulated Palestinian village in present-day northern Israel
Al-Bassah, Jordan, a town in the Amman Governorate, Jordan
Al-Bassah, Syria, a village in the Latakia Governorate, Syria